Denis Navarro (born March 16, 1987 in São Paulo) is a Brazilian auto racing driver. He currently drives in the Stock Car Brasil.

Racing record

Career summary

Complete Stock Car Brasil results

References

External links
 

1987 births
Living people
Brazilian racing drivers
Formula 3 Sudamericana drivers
Stock Car Brasil drivers
Racing drivers from São Paulo
Indy Pro 2000 Championship drivers
Brazilian Formula Three Championship drivers
Brazilian Formula Renault 2.0 drivers